Hana Peterková (born 19 February 1987) is a Czech female canoeist who won four medals at senior level of the Wildwater Canoeing World Championships and European Wildwater Championships.

References

External links
 Hana Peterková at Rafting s Hanace

1987 births
Living people
Czech female canoeists
Place of birth missing (living people)